The Judgement Rocks, part of the Kent Group, is a small unpopulated  granite islet and some associated bare rocks, located in the Bass Strait, lying off the north-east coast of Tasmania, between the Furneaux Group and Wilsons Promontory in Victoria, Australia. The islet and associated rocks are contained within the Kent Group National Park.

The rock was named by Matthew Flinders "from its resemblance to an elevated seat".

Joanna Murray-Smith's novel Judgement Rock is named for the rocks and set among the islands of the Kent Group.

Fauna
Recorded breeding seabird and wader species include fairy prion, Pacific gull, silver gull, and sooty oystercatcher.  The island hosts Tasmania's largest breeding colony of Australian fur seals, which also attracts visits by killer whales.  The only reptile present is the metallic skink.

See also

 List of islands of Tasmania
 Protected areas of Tasmania

References

External links
 

Islands of Northern Tasmania
Protected areas of Tasmania
Islands of Bass Strait